Locos de amor 3 is a 2020 Peruvian musical romantic comedy film directed by Frank Pérez-Garland and written by Carlos Galiano. It is the third part of Locos de amor (2016) and Locos de amor 2 (2018). This time it stars Katia Condos, Patricia Portocarrero and Ebelin Ortiz.

Synopsis 
This is the story of 3 best friends on the verge of 50, who have something in common: they suffer for love. Sarah has just made one of her dreams come true: to get married; but on her wedding day she discovers that her husband is unfaithful to her. Marta faces divorce proceedings, and Doris deals with her routine married life. Will these three women be able to achieve the maturity they need to solve their love conflicts?

Cast 
The actors participating in this film are:

 Ebelin Ortiz as Sarah
 Katia Condos as Marta
 Patricia Portocarrero as Doris
 Aldo Miyashiro
 Leonardo Torres Vilar
 Orlando Fundichely
 Rebeca Escribens
 Sergio Galliani

Production 
Locos de amor 3 was filmed in mid-August 2019 over four weeks in different locations such as Magdalena, Miraflores, Barranco, Residencial San Felipe, Surco and La Encantada de Villa.

Release 
Locos de amor 3 premiered on 13 February 2020, in Peruvian theaters, but was quickly withdrawn from the theaters due to the COVID-19 pandemic. It was later re-released online on 9 May 2020, on the Netzun platform.

Reception 
Locos de amor 3 drew 205,000 viewers in its first weekend in theaters. It exceeded 400,000 viewers in its second weekend.

References

External links 

 

2020 films
2020 romantic comedy films
Peruvian musical films
Peruvian romantic comedy films
Tondero Producciones films
2020s Spanish-language films
2020s Peruvian films
Films set in Peru
Films shot in Peru
Films about infidelity
Films about divorce
Films about marriage
Peruvian sequel films
Films impacted by the COVID-19 pandemic